Life Among the Ruins is the fifth full-length studio album by US heavy metal band Virgin Steele. It was released in 1993, after almost five years of inactivity. The song "Snakeskin Voodoo Man" was present only in the American release and was instead released as a single in 1992 in Europe, at the same time of the VHS Tale of the Snakeskin Voodoo Man. The VHS featured videos for "Snakeskin Voodoo Man", "Love Is Pain", "Invitation-I Dress in Black" and "Cage of Angels-Never Believed in Good-Bye", interviews and backstage footage. The music of this album is bluesy hard rock and melodic metal, more similar to early Whitesnake's recordings than the epic power metal of albums like Noble Savage and the following The Marriage of Heaven and Hell Part I. This is the first album with bassist Rob DeMartino, who replaced Joe O'Reilly, retired from the scene.

Track listing
All lyrics by David DeFeis, music as indicated

Personnel

Band members
David DeFeis - vocals, keyboards
Ed Pursino - all guitars, bass
Rob DeMartino - bass
Joey Ayvazian - drums

Additional musicians
Teddy Cook - bass on tracks 2, 5, 8, 9, 10, 12
Dave Ferrara - lead guitar on track 11

Production
Virgin Steele - producers on tracks 1, 3, 6, 7, 8, 11
DeFeis / Pursino - producers on tracks 2, 4, 5, 9, 10, 12, 14
DeFeis / Chris Bubacz - producers on tracks 13, 15

References

1993 albums
Virgin Steele albums